Sepsina bayonii, also known commonly as Bayon's skink, is a species of lizard in the family Scincidae. The species is native to Central Africa and Southern Africa.

Etymology
The specific name, bayonii, is in honor of Francisco Antonio Pinheiro Bayão, a Portuguese planter in Angola, who collected the holotype.

Geographic range
S. bayonii is found in Angola and in the Democratic Republic of the Congo.

Habitat

Description
S. bayonii has no front legs. Each back leg is very small, tapering, and ends in a claw.

Behavior
S. bayonii burrows in leaf litter and loose sandy soil.

Reproduction
S. bayonii is viviparous.

References

Further reading
Bocage JVB (1866). "Reptiles nouveaux ou peu connus recueillis dans les possessions portugaises de l'Afrique occidentale, qui se trouvent au Muséum de Lisbonne". Jornal de Sciencias Mathematicas Physicas e Naturaes, Lisboa 1: 57–78 + Plate I. (Dumerilia bayonii, new species, pp. 63–64). (in French).
Peters W (1875). "Über zwei Gattungen von Eidechsen, Scincodipus und Sphenoscincus". Monatsberichte der Königliche Preussischen Akademie der Wissenschaften zu Berlin 1875: 551–553 + Plate. (Scincodipus congicus, new species, pp. 551–552 + Plate, figures 1–5). (in German).

bayonii
Reptiles described in 1866
Taxa named by José Vicente Barbosa du Bocage